The Stranger is the fifth studio album by American singer Billy Joel, released in September 1977 by Columbia Records. It was the first of Joel's albums to be produced by Phil Ramone, with whom he would work for five subsequent albums.

Joel's previous studio effort, Turnstiles, had sold modestly and peaked low on the US charts, prompting Columbia to consider dropping him if his next release sold poorly. Joel wanted the new album to feature his touring band, formed during the production of Turnstiles. The band consisted of drummer Liberty DeVitto, bassist Doug Stegmeyer, and multi-instrumentalist saxophonist/organist Richie Cannata. Seeking out a new producer, he first turned to veteran Beatles producer George Martin before coming across and settling on Ramone, whose name he had seen on albums by other artists such as Paul Simon. Recording took place over three weeks, featuring DeVitto, Stegmeyer and Cannata. Other studio musicians filled in as guitarists on various songs.

Four singles were released in the US, all of which became top-40 hits on the Billboard Hot 100 charts: "Just the Way You Are", "Movin' Out (Anthony's Song)", "She's Always a Woman" (both ), and "Only the Good Die Young". Other songs, such as "Scenes from an Italian Restaurant" and "Vienna", have become staples of his career and are frequently performed in his live shows. The album won two awards at the 1978 Grammy Awards: Record of the Year and Song of the Year for "Just the Way You Are". It remains his best-selling non-compilation album to date, and surpassed Simon & Garfunkel's Bridge over Troubled Water to become Columbia's best-selling album release, with more than 10 million units sold worldwide. Rolling Stone later named it one of the 500 greatest albums of all time.

Background
Before The Stranger, Billy Joel was on the verge of being dropped by his record label Columbia Records. After the unexpected success of Joel's second album, Piano Man, his subsequent albums were commercially disappointing. Turnstiles, Joel's 1976 release, had peaked at only number 122 on the Billboard 200 chart.

By 1976, Joel had formed a reliable touring band, consisting of Doug Stegmeyer on bass, Liberty DeVitto on drums and Richie Cannata on saxophone, flute, clarinet and organ. Joel grew to appreciate this group of musicians, finding that they had a high-energy, rough-around-the-edges feel that he hoped to capture in his studio recordings. Joel had mostly worked with session players for his first three studio albums, which contained only scattered contributions from his own backup musicians, and strongly disliked the polished sound of these albums. During the production of Turnstiles, his fourth album, Joel initially worked with veteran producer Jim Guercio, who had him work with members of Elton John's band; dissatisfied with the results, Joel instead opted to self-produce the album and record with his own touring band. Joel was likewise set on recording his fifth studio album with this band. Having written some new material for the record, Joel sought a producer who could cultivate his desired style. Joel, a longtime fan of the Beatles, initially looked to famed Beatles producer George Martin. But after meeting with Joel, Martin expressed interest in producing the album, but did not want to use Joel's band, wishing instead to bring in session players. Joel, however, was adamant in his desire to record with his own band and declined Martin's offer. Ultimately, Joel turned to Phil Ramone, a veteran New York City sound engineer and record producer who had recently worked with Paul Simon, another singer-songwriter, on Simon's album Still Crazy After All These Years. According to Joel, he and Ramone met with each other at Fontana di Trevi, an Italian restaurant near Carnegie Hall, where Joel had been playing at the time. The restaurant would go on to inspire the setting of "Scenes from an Italian Restaurant", a song on The Stranger. According to Joel, Ramone expressed an appreciation for Joel's band and their energy, and understood the reasoning behind Joel's attitude towards recording, which ultimately led Joel to choose Ramone as the producer for his next album.

Production and recording

The recording sessions for The Stranger, described by Joel as "a blast" to be a part of, took place across the short span of three weeks in between July and August 1977. The album contains nine songs, four of which were released as singles in North America. The songs were all recorded with Joel alongside his band which he had formed while touring, in addition to various other musicians who were brought into the studio for specific songs. Despite the formation of Joel's band, the songs on The Stranger didn't feature any consistent guitarists, with different players instead featuring in each song, and according to Joel, the reason for the initial lack of a constant guitarist was because it was hard to find the right one. The photograph on the back cover of the album, featuring Joel, Ramone (donning a Yankees shirt at the time of the picture) and each of the band members, was taken at the Supreme Macaroni Company, one of several restaurants where the group would go to "have these crazy lunches and dinners".

The opening song, "Movin' Out (Anthony's Song)", centers around Anthony, a grocery-store employee from Long Island who "dreams of making it big", receiving pressure from his family to move out and go his own way. Joel stated in a Q&A session that he initially wrote the song's lyrics to the tune of the song "Laughter in the Rain" by Neil Sedaka, doing so without even realizing the similarity until it was brashly pointed out the next day by drummer Liberty DeVitto. Not wanting to waste all of the words he had come up with, Joel rewrote the song, coming up with a new melody that fit with the lyrics. The album's title track, according to Joel, was written by him without any core themes in mind and could be open up to interpretation, though he stated that it could be seen as a song about a man with schizophrenia. While composing the song, Joel whistled the track's signature theme for Ramone, claiming that he (Joel) needed to find an instrument to play it. Ramone told Joel that the whistling he did was perfect, and thus it was kept in the final recording. According to Joel in an interview with Today, the percussive rhythm used in the song came about while he was toying around with an Ace Tone Rhythm Ace drum machine, which contained a drum beat that he heard while scrolling through the machine's library of rhythm tracks. After hearing the beat, he thought that the rhythm would be nice to fool around with, and wrote the song shortly afterwards. "Just the Way You Are" was inspired by Joel's love for his wife at the time, Elizabeth Weber. He stated on a SiriusXM broadcast in 2016 that the melody came to him in a dream while he was working on The Stranger. He forgot about the melody shortly afterwards, but it came back to him while he was in a business meeting. Joel originally considered keeping the song off the album, as he dismissed it as a "gloppy ballad" that was out-of-place compared to the rest of the album. Ramone disagreed, and brought Linda Ronstadt and Phoebe Snow into the studio to prove that it was worth including. Upon hearing the song, the two artists both praised it, thus convincing him to feature the song. The 7 minute epic "Scenes from an Italian Restaurant", which follows a pair of young lovers from Long Island named Brenda and Eddie who go through a failed marriage, is three different, shorter songs: "The Italian Restaurant Song", "Things Are OK in Oyster Bay" and "The Ballad of Brenda and Eddie". Joel stitched the three songs together, inspired by the similar approach taken with side two of the Beatles' Abbey Road and by Freddie Mercury and Queen with "Bohemian Rhapsody", while Ramone helped intertwine them with backing orchestration.

The song "Vienna", which opens up the album's B-side, was inspired by a trip Joel took to Vienna, Austria to visit his father a few years after starting his music career. While there, he found that Austrians had a vastly different outlook on life than the one he was familiar with in America. As he recalls, Joel had this realization after taking notice of an old woman sweeping out on the city streets, telling his father that he pitied the woman for having to do such a menial and unimportant task; Joel's father responded by explaining that the woman was giving herself a sense of worth by doing a service that helped everyone rather than "sitting at home wasting away". Joel tried to make the song feel Viennese in nature and compared it to the work of Bertolt Brecht and Kurt Weill, specifically The Threepenny Opera. "Only the Good Die Young", which is sung from the point-of-view of a boy trying to appeal to an abstinent Catholic woman, was inspired by a girl named Virginia Davis who Joel had a crush on in high school. According to Joel, he saw Davis looking at him while he was playing in his high school band, The Echoes, which was the event that had him "completely hooked" to the prospect of being a musician. "Only the Good Die Young" was written by Joel while opening for the Beach Boys in Knoxville, Tennessee, at which point it sounded slower-pace and more akin to a reggae tune, with Joel even singing the song's lyrics in a Jamaican accent. The mood of the song was shifted at the insistence of drummer Liberty DeVitto, who reportedly said to Joel "Why are you singing like that? The closest you've been to Jamaica was the Long Island Rail Road!" Ramone suggested that the song be played as a straight-four piece while DeVitto played a shuffle beat, a proposition which Joel found he enjoyed the sound of despite the concept initially seeming "odd and clunky". The song featured guitar playing by Hugh McCracken, a famous session player who Ramone brought in.  "She's Always a Woman", like "Just the Way You Are", was written about Elizabeth Weber, described by Joel as "a commentary on women in business being persecuted and insulted". Joel tried to stylize the song as one which would be sung by Gordon Lightfoot. "Get It Right the First Time" is inspired by the challenge of first meeting and confronting a person, highlighting the importance of not flubbing such an encounter and "gett[ing] it right the first time". The album's final song, "Everybody Has a Dream", a gospel-influenced piece, was also inspired by Joel's wife. The song closes the album out with a reprise of the whistled theme from "The Stranger".

Commercial performance
The Stranger spent 17 weeks in varying positions within Billboard 200 chart's top 10 albums, first entering the bottom position on January 21, 1978 (around four months after its initial release). A month later, on February 18, the album reached its peak position at number 2 on the chart and remained there for six more weeks. The second single from the album, "Just The Way You Are", peaked at number 3 on the Billboard Hot 100 chart, having received a boost in popularity following Joel's performance of the song on an episode of Saturday Night Live. The other three singles were all top 40 hits, with "Movin' Out (Anthony's Song)" and "She's Always a Woman" both peaking at number 17. While "Movin' Out (Anthony's Song)" was the first single released for the album, radio stations put little attention towards it, instead expressing interest in "Just the Way You Are"; thus, the latter song was released just six weeks following the debut of "Movin' Out", after which it achieved far larger success. The single for "Movin' Out" was later rereleased, after which it achieved higher success and ultimately became a hit. According to Joel, "Only the Good Die Young" sold poorly when it was first put out as a single; however, following the song's release, Christian groups and archdiocese areas began calling for the song to be banned on several radio stations across the nation. The controversy helped raise the song's popularity, particularly among rebellious youth according to Joel, and the single thus fared much better as a result, ultimately peaking at number 24 in the US singles chart. The Stranger remains one of Joel's best-selling original studio albums to date, achieving a "Diamond" certification for surpassing sales of 10 million units. At the time, it had surpassed Simon & Garfunkel's Bridge over Troubled Water to become Columbia Records’ best-selling album release.

Reception

The Stranger was well-received by critics, particularly in retrospect, with many considering it to display some of Joel's best-written material. In a contemporary review of the album, Ira Mayer of Rolling Stone deemed it an improvement over Joel's previous studio efforts, praising its musical variety and Ramone's production. In a less enthusiastic review, Village Voice critic Robert Christgau graded the album "B−" and held it slightly above Joel's previous works; speaking specifically of Joel himself, he wrote that the artist had "more or less grown up" with what he considered less egotistical songwriting, and that he is "now as likeable as your once-rebellious and still-tolerant uncle who has the quirk of believing that OPEC was designed to ruin his air-conditioning business".

Retrospectively, Sal Cinquemani of Slant Magazine described The Stranger as "a concept album of sorts, an ode to the singer's native New York underscored by his paranoid obsession (and resistance) to change". He called the album "a rejection of the American Dream", highlighting the pessimism expressed in some of its songs' lyrics. Stephen Thomas Erlewine of AllMusic praised The Stranger as a highlight of Joel's discography, noting that its lyrical shortcomings are outweighed by Joel's musical flair, and ultimately concluding that Joel "rarely wrote a set of songs better than those on The Stranger, nor did he often deliver an album as consistently listenable". Rolling Stone ranked The Stranger at number 67 on its 2003 list of the 500 greatest albums of all time. It also placed on the 2012 and 2020 editions of the list at numbers 70 and 169, respectively. In 2000, The Stranger was voted number 246 in Colin Larkin's All Time Top 1000 Albums.

As his breakthrough album, The Stranger kicked off a long string of successful albums for Joel, continuing up through 1993's River of Dreams. George Martin, who had initially declined to produce The Stranger using Joel's band, reportedly wrote Joel a letter following the album's massive success, in which he congratulated Joel and reflected that he was wrong about the band. Phil Ramone would continue to serve as Joel's producer for a number of years, working with him on each of his albums up through 1986's The Bridge. "Movin' Out (Anthony's Song)" went on to lend its name to a 2002 jukebox musical, featuring several of Joel's songs alongside narrative choreography by Twyla Tharp. The play ran successfully on Broadway for three years, holding its final performance on December 15, 2005 after a total of 1,303 performances. In 2017, to celebrate the album's 40th anniversary, a picture-disc vinyl rerelease of The Stranger with newly remastered audio was released by Brookville Records on October 20.

Many of the songs from the album went on to become staples in Joel's repertoire. Though never released as a single, "Scenes from an Italian Restaurant" is a staple of his live set, named by Rolling Stones Rob Sheffield as Joel's equivalent to Bruce Springsteen's "Jungleland". Joel stated in an interview that "I don't think I could do a show without performing that song." "Vienna" has also become a popular part of his live set; when Joel lets the audience choose between it and "Just the Way You Are", "Vienna" is most often the winning contender. The song was featured in an episode of the TV series Taxi, and was prominently showcased later on in the 2004 teenage comedy film 13 Going on 30. Joel has cited "Scenes from an Italian Restaurant" and "Vienna" as his favorite and 5th-favorite songs that he has written, respectively.

Track listing

Original release
All songs written and composed by Billy Joel.

On the LP and cassette release, track 5 includes a reprise of "The Stranger"; the 8-track does not.

8-track tape running order
 "The Stranger" – "Just the Way You Are"
 "Movin' Out (Anthony's Song)" – "Vienna" – "She's Always a Woman"
 "Only the Good Die Young" – "Scenes from an Italian Restaurant (Part 1)"
 "Scenes from an Italian Restaurant (Conclusion)" - "Get It Right the First Time" – "Everyone Has a Dream"

30th Anniversary Edition
In July 2008, a special "30th Anniversary Edition" of The Stranger was released. It contains two special editions: a two-CD Legacy Edition, and a Deluxe Limited Edition (which includes two CDs and a bonus DVD). The limited deluxe edition of The Stranger includes a CD of the original album in its entirety (remastered by producer Phil Ramone), and a second CD of a previously unreleased concert featuring Billy and his band, Live at Carnegie Hall 1977, recorded at the historic Manhattan venue on June 3, 1977, one month before the sessions for The Stranger album. The Deluxe Limited Edition included a DVD showcasing two live promotional videos from The Stranger; and Joel's performance on the BBC's Old Grey Whistle Test, a seldom-seen 60-minute set from 1978 that has aired only once on the UK's BBC2. Also included in this box set is a facsimile poster from the 1977 Carnegie Hall concert, and a facsimile notebook that contains copies of rough draft lyrics for many of the songs that appeared on The Stranger.

Live at Carnegie Hall, June 3, 1977 CD
 "Miami 2017 (Seen the Lights Go Out on Broadway)" – 5:11
 "Prelude/Angry Young Man" – 6:05
 "New York State of Mind" – 8:20
 "Just the Way You Are" – 4:56
 "She's Got a Way" – 3:32
 "The Entertainer" – 6:09
 "Scenes from an Italian Restaurant" – 7:35
 "Band Introductions" – 2:02
 "Captain Jack" – 6:51
 "I've Loved These Days" – 4:29
 "Say Goodbye to Hollywood" – 6:45
 "Souvenir" – 2:09

Bonus DVD
 Live Promotional Videos, 1977
 "The Stranger"
 "Just the Way You Are"
 The Old Grey Whistle Test on BBC1 (First broadcast March 14, 1978)
 "Intro"
 "Miami 2017 (Seen the Lights Go Out on Broadway)"
 "Movin' Out (Anthony's Song)"
 "New York State of Mind"
 "The Entertainer"
 "She's Always a Woman"
 "Root Beer Rag"
 "Just the Way You Are"
 "Only the Good Die Young"
 "Souvenir"
 "Ain't No Crime"
 30-minute "Making of The Stranger" documentary

Best Buy exclusive bonus CD (Live at Nassau Coliseum 12/77)
(packaged with both the 2-CD Legacy and 2CD/1DVD 30th Anniversary Edition)
 "Just the Way You Are"
 "Vienna"
 "The Ballad of Billy the Kid"
 "Get It Right the First Time"
 "Summer, Highland Falls"

Target exclusive bonus DVD
(packaged with the 2-CD Legacy Edition)
 "Movin' Out (Anthony's Song)" (Live from Long Island, New York)
 "The Stranger" (Live from Long Island, New York)
 "Only the Good Die Young" (Live from Leningrad, Russia)
 "Scenes from an Italian Restaurant" (Live from Yankee Stadium, The Bronx, New York City)
 "Piano Man" (Live from The River of Dreams Tour)

Online store bonus tracks
 "Prelude/Angry Young Man" (Live version) (Version 2) (iTunes Album Only Exclusive Track) – 5:03
 "She's Got a Way" (Live Version) (Version 2) (AmazonMP3 Exclusive Track) – 3:42

Personnel 

 Billy Joel – vocals, acoustic piano, Fender Rhodes, keyboards, synthesizers
 Richie Cannata – organ, tenor saxophone, soprano saxophone, clarinet, flute, tuba
 Dominic Cortese – accordion (4, 5)
 Richard Tee – organ (9)
 Hiram Bullock – electric guitar
 Steve Khan – 6 and 12-string electric guitars, acoustic rhythm guitar, high-string guitar
 Hugh McCracken – acoustic guitar (3, 4, 7, 8, 9)
 Steve Burgh – acoustic guitar (3, 7), electric guitar (4)
 Doug Stegmeyer – bass 
 Liberty DeVitto – drums
 Ralph MacDonald – percussion (2, 3, 8, 9)
 Phil Woods – alto saxophone (3)
 Patrick Williams – orchestration
 Patti Austin, Lani Groves, Gwen Guthrie, and Phoebe Snow – backing vocals (9)

Production 
 Phil Ramone – producer, engineer
 Jim Boyer – engineer
 Ted Jensen – mastering at Sterling Sound (New York, NY)
 Kathy Kurs – production assistance 
 Jim Houghton – photography

Live at Carnegie Hall June 3, 1977
 Billy Joel – vocals, acoustic piano and synthesizers
 Richie Cannata – saxophones and keyboards
 Howie Emerson – electric and acoustic guitars
 Doug Stegmeyer – Fender bass
 Liberty DeVitto – drums
 Recorded by David Hewitt using Record Plant NY Remote Truck.

Charts and certifications

Weekly charts
Original issue

2008 reissue

Year-end charts

Certifications

Accolades
Grammy Awards

Release history

See also
List of best-selling albums in the United States

References

External links

The Stranger (Adobe Flash) at Radio3Net (streamed copy where licensed)

1977 albums
Billy Joel albums
Grammy Hall of Fame Award recipients
Albums produced by Phil Ramone
Columbia Records albums
Albums arranged by Patrick Williams (composer)